Nassar Al-Dosari (born 1965) is a Saudi Arabian fencer. He competed in the team épée event at the 1984 Summer Olympics in Los Angeles.

References

External links
 

1965 births
Living people
Saudi Arabian male épée fencers
Olympic fencers of Saudi Arabia
Fencers at the 1984 Summer Olympics